City of Play is a 1929 British drama film directed by Denison Clift and starring Chili Bouchier, Patrick Aherne and Lawson Butt. It was made by Gainsborough Pictures and produced by Michael Balcon. It was made partly in sound.

Cast
 Chili Bouchier as Ariel
 Patrick Aherne as Richard von Rolf
 Lawson Butt as Tambourini
 James Carew as Gen. von Rolf
 Harold Huth as Arezzi
 Andrews Engelmann as Colonel von Lessing
 Leila Dresner as Zelah
 Olaf Hytten as Schulz

References

Bibliography
 Low, Rachel. The History of British Film: Volume IV, 1918–1929. Routledge, 1997.

External links

1929 films
1929 drama films
British drama films
1920s English-language films
Films directed by Denison Clift
Circus films
Films about hypnosis
Films set in Germany
Transitional sound drama films
British black-and-white films
1920s British films